Hnat A. Domenichelli (born February 16, 1976) is a Canadian-Swiss former professional ice hockey player of Ukrainian descent. He was drafted by the Hartford Whalers in the fourth round, 83rd overall, of the 1994 NHL Entry Draft. He played 267 National Hockey League (NHL) games for the Whalers, Calgary Flames, Atlanta Thrashers and Minnesota Wild between 1996 and 2003 before moving to Switzerland where he has played for the remainder of his career in the National League A.  He played for Switzerland at the 2010 Winter Olympics.

Domenichelli is currently the general manager of HC Lugano of the National League (NL).

Playing career
Born in Edmonton, Alberta, Domenichelli had a stand-out junior career with the Kamloops Blazers of the Western Hockey League (WHL).  He was a WHL West Second Team All-Star in 1995, and a First Team All-Star in 1996, also gaining a nod as a Canadian Hockey League (CHL) First-Team All-Star.  He won the Brad Hornung Trophy as the WHL's sportsman of the year, and was named the CHL Sportsman of the Year, both in 1996. He won the WHL championship with the Blazers in 1995 and the Memorial Cup as national Major-Junior champion in both 1995 and 1996.

The Hartford Whalers selected Domenichelli in the fourth round, 83rd overall, in the 1994 NHL Entry Draft. He made his professional debut with the Whalers' American Hockey League (AHL) affiliate, the Springfield Falcons, in the 1996–97 season. He also appeared in 13 games with the Whalers that season before being traded to the Calgary Flames.

Domenichelli appeared in 96 games over four seasons with the Flames before being traded, along with Dmitri Vlasenkov, to the Atlanta Thrashers during the 1999–2000 season in exchange for Jason Botterill and Darryl Shannon. He had the best scoring season of his NHL career during the 2000–01 season with the Thrashers, scoring 15 goals.  During the 2001–02 season, the Thrashers traded Domenichelli to the Minnesota Wild for Andy Sutton. He left the Wild for Switzerland after the 2002–03 season.

Domenichelli played for Team Canada at the Spengler Cup early in his European hockey career., before he became a Swiss citizen in 2009, which allowed him to play for the country's national team at the 2010 Winter Olympics.

Career statistics

Regular season and playoffs

International

Awards and honours

References

External links 
 

1976 births
Atlanta Thrashers players
EHC Basel players
SC Bern players
Calgary Flames players
Canadian ice hockey centres
Canadian people of Italian descent
Canadian people of Ukrainian descent
Hartford Whalers draft picks
Hartford Whalers players
HC Ambrì-Piotta players
HC Lugano players
Houston Aeros (1994–2013) players
Ice hockey players at the 2010 Winter Olympics
Kamloops Blazers players
Living people
Minnesota Wild players
Naturalised citizens of Switzerland
Olympic ice hockey players of Switzerland
Saint John Flames players
Ice hockey people from Edmonton
Springfield Falcons players
ZSC Lions players
Canadian expatriate ice hockey players in Switzerland